Alfredo Castro may refer to:

 Alfredo Castro (footballer), Portuguese footballer
 Alfredo Castro (actor), Chilean actor